Utah, a state in the western United States that straddles the intersection of the Colorado Plateau, the Great Basin, and the Rocky Mountains, has been the traditional home of several Uto-Aztecan bands from a few tribes that are considered Paiute and Shoshone. The Shoshone in Utah belong to the Goshute and Northern Shoshone linguistic group, while the various Paiute peoples either belong to the Ute or Southern Paiute linguistic classifications. As such, in total, there are two Native American languages spoken in Utah: Shoshone and Colorado River Numic.

Distribution
There are two Native American languages currently spoken in Utah. Population estimates are based on figures from Ethnologue and U.S. Census data, as given in sub-pages below. The two languages are shown in the table below:

Minority Languages 
Navajo language is spoken on the Navajo Nation, which is split between Arizona, New Mexico, and Utah, in order of decreasing land area present in each respective state. Navajo is an Athabaskan language.

See also
 Native Americans in the United States
 Indigenous peoples of the Great Basin
 Indigenous languages of the Americas
 Uto-Aztecan languages

References

Indigenous languages of the North American Great Basin
Indigenous languages of the Southwestern United States
Native American history of Utah
Utah